Sekolah Menengah Sains Seri Puteri (abbreviated SESERI) is an all-girls fully residential school in Malaysia, located in the heart of Kuala Lumpur. Each class and house in SESERI is named after a family of orchids.

SESERI was officially opened on 3 June 2003, on the previous site of Sekolah Seri Puteri which moved to a new site in Cyberjaya. 2004 was the first year for the Form 5 students of Seseri to sit for Sijil Pelajaran Malaysia (SPM)

The 46th Sekolah Berasrama Penuh in Malaysia, the school consists of only female students who got straight As in PT3 selected throughout the country. Starting from 2016, Seseri takes in form 1 students who got 5As in their UPSR examination. During 2017, Seseri takes in students who scored 6As - 4As due to the changes made in the UPSR format.

The school consists of an administrative block, a science laboratories block, academic blocks, main hall, a cafeteria and a court called Gelanggang Anggerik Sari. In the hostel, there are three residential blocks, a mosque, a dining hall and a sports field.

In the recent SPM examination (2019), the school gained GPS of 1.68.

References

External links
 

Schools in Kuala Lumpur
Educational institutions established in 2003
2003 establishments in Malaysia
Girls' schools in Malaysia